Brian McGuinness (22 October 1927 – 23 December 2019) was a Wittgenstein scholar best known for his translation, with David Pears, of the Tractatus-Logico-Philosophicus.

He was christened with the forenames "Bernard Francis" but changed his name to "Brian" in his youth. He commonly published, and was cited, as B. F. McGuinness.

Formerly a tutee of RM Hare, McGuinness was a Fellow and Tutor at Queen's College in Oxford University from 1953 to 1988, and took a post at the Netherlands Institute for Advanced Study. In 1990, he became a professor at the University of Siena, Italy. From 1990 to 1993, he was director of the faculty of philosophy and social sciences of this university. During his time at Queen's, he was an invited speaker at the Oxford Socratic Club, speaking with J. D. Mabbott on "The Problem of Free Will" on 14 November 1955.

Family
His son, Paddy McGuinness, is a former British civil servant who was the Deputy National Security Adviser for Intelligence.

Select bibliography

Books authored 
 Wittgenstein: A Life: Young Ludwig, 1889-1921, (1988) 
(with Guido Frongia) Wittgenstein: A Bibliographical Guide  (1990) 
Approaches to Wittgenstein: Collected Papers, (2002).

Select papers 
 "The Mysticism of the Tractatus", Philosophical Review, vol. 75 (1966), pp. 305–28.
 "Philosophy of Science in the Tractatus", Revue Internationale de Philosophie, vol. 23 (1969), pp. 155–64.
 "Bertrand Russell and Ludwig Wittgenstein's Notes on Logic", Revue Internationale de Philosophie, vol. 26 (1972), pp. 444–60.

Works edited/translated 
(with David Pears) Ludwig Wittgenstein: Tractatus Logico-Philosophicus, (1961)  
Felix Kaufmann: The Infinite in Mathematics: Logico-Mathematical Writings, (1978) 
Hans Hahn: Empiricism, Logic and Mathematics: Philosophical Papers, (1980) 
Gottlob Frege: Collected Papers on Mathematics, Logic and Philosophy, (1984) 
Ernst Mach: Principles of the Theory of Heat: Historically and Critically Elucidated, (1986) 
Unified science. The Vienna monograph series, originally edited by Otto Neurath, now in an English edition. (1987) 
(with J. Schulte) Friedrich Waismann, Josef Schächter, Moritz Schlick: Ethics and the will: Essays, (1994) 
(with Gianluigi Oliveri) The Philosophy of Michael Dummett, (1994) 
(with Gianluigi Oliveri) Karl Menger: Reminiscences of the Vienna Circle and the Mathematical Colloquium (1994). 
(with George Henrik von Wright) Ludwig Wittgenstein: Cambridge Letters, (1995) 
 Wittgenstein in Cambridge: Letters and Documents 1911-1951 (2008)  
Language, Logic, and Formalization of Knowledge: Coimbra Lecture and Proceedings of a Symposium Held in Siena in September 1997, (1998)

References

External links 

 "A Tapestry: Susan Edwards-McKie Interviews Professor Dr B. F. McGuinness on the Occasion of His 90th Birthday" Susan Edwards-McKie & Brian McGuinness, Nordic Wittgenstein Review 6 (2):85-90 (2017)
November 2017 laudatio by Josef Mitterer given on the occasion of McGuinness receiving an honorary doctorate from the University of Innsbruck.

1927 births
2019 deaths
20th-century British non-fiction writers
20th-century British philosophers
21st-century British non-fiction writers
21st-century British philosophers
Alumni of Balliol College, Oxford
Analytic philosophers
British logicians
British male non-fiction writers
Fellows of The Queen's College, Oxford
Institute for Advanced Study faculty
James Tait Black Memorial Prize recipients
Philosophers of language
Philosophers of logic
Philosophers of mathematics
Philosophers of science
Philosophers of social science
Academic staff of the University of Siena
Wittgensteinian philosophers